Undead is the ninth studio album by American death metal band Six Feet Under. It is their first album to feature drummer Kevin Talley and guitarist Rob Arnold.

Background
Vocalist Chris Barnes commented of the recording: "I'm in pretty much the best head space I've been in since myself and [former guitarist] Allen West started this band in 1993. I'm super excited about the new record. It's a rejuvenation; it's a rebirth of Six Feet Under, and fans will definitely latch on to my excitement and how focused I am in the lyrics I've written… The hypocrisies of daily life, things that affect us that spawn aggression, loneliness, sadness, there's a lot of emotions going on across the record, and I guess that the dark horror that humans cause is my niche."

Reviews
The album was called "the best thing SFU have recorded since Maximum Violence," in an 8/10 review by Decibel magazine. Terrorizer magazine wrote that, "Ugly riffs slip and slide amidst the primordial ooze summoned forth by Chris' guttural incantations, and the drums flail in the background like some tentacle monstrosity from beyond; this is truly an unearthly noise and glorious in its heaving absurdity."

Track listing
All lyrics written by Chris Barnes. All music written by Rob Arnold.

Personnel
Six Feet Under
Chris Barnes - vocals
Steve Swanson - lead guitar
Rob Arnold - rhythm guitar; bass
Kevin Talley - drums
Production
Produced by Mark Lewis at Audiohammer Studios
Drum engineering by Kevin Talley and Mark Lewis
Guitar engineering by Rob Arnold and Chaz Najjar
Vocal engineering by Chris Barnes and Chaz Najjar
Mixed by Eyal Levi and Jason Suecof at Audiohammer Studios
Mastered by Alan Douches at West West Side Music
Artwork
Cover art by Dusty Peterson
Layout by Bryan Ames

2012 albums
Six Feet Under (band) albums
Metal Blade Records albums
Albums produced by Mark Lewis (music producer)